Alfredo Perrulas Quaresma (16 July 1944 – 30 March 2007) was a Portuguese footballer who played as forward.

Football career 

Quaresma gained 3 caps and scored 1 goal for Portugal and made his debut 3 March 1973 in Paris against France, in a 2–1 win. He played his last game on 13 October 1973, in a 2–2 draw with Bulgaria, where he also scored his only international goal.

|}

Personal life
Many media outlets referred to him as being the great-uncle of another footballer, Ricardo Quaresma, though the latter later denied this.

References

External links 
 
 

1944 births
2007 deaths
Association football forwards
C.F. Os Belenenses players
Portuguese footballers
Primeira Liga players
Portugal international footballers
Sportspeople from Funchal